Dato' Haji Hasni bin Mohammad (Jawi: حسني بن محمد; born 27 March 1959) is a Malaysian politician who has served as Member of Parliament (MP) for Simpang Renggam since November 2022, Member of the Johor State Legislative Assembly (MLA) for Benut since March 2008 and Chairman of the Malaysian Highway Authority (LLM) since August 2022. He served as the 18th Menteri Besar of Johor from February 2020 to March 2022, State Leader of the Opposition of Johor from June 2018 to February 2020, Member of the Johor State Executive Council (EXCO) from May 2013 to May 2018 and Member of Parliament (MP) for Pontian from March 2004 to March 2008. He is member of the United Malays National Organisation (UMNO), a component party of the ruling Barisan Nasional (BN) coalition. He has served as the State Chairman of BN of Johor since 2018. He served as the State Chairman of UMNO of Johor from 2018 to his removal from the position in January 2023 and Division Chairman of UMNO of Pontian from 2001 to his defeat in the party elections in March 2023.

Political career

Member of Parliament for Pontian (2004–2008)
Hasni was first elected to Malaysian Parliament as the MP of Pontian in the 2004 general election (GE11).

Member of the Johor State Legislative Assembly for Benut (since 2008)
In the 2008 general election (GE12), he was elected as the Member of the Johor State Legislative Assembly for Benut. He managed to retain the seat again in 2013 (GE13) and 2018 (GE14) general elections. In the 2022 Johor state election, he was reelected as the Benut assemblyman for his 4th consecutive term by defeating all of his 3 opponents, Isa Abdul Hamid from Perikatan Nasional (PN), Haniff Ghazali Hosman from Pakatan Harapan (PH) and Iskandar Noor Ibrahim from Homeland Fighters Party (PEJUANG) with a majority of 5,859 votes.

Member of the Johor State Executive Council (2013–2018)
He was appointed as an EXCO member by former Menteri Besar Mohamed Khaled Nordin.

State Leader of the Opposition of Johor (2018–2020)

But in the aftermath GE14 which saw the fall of BN coalition government, he was elected the Opposition Leader of Johor from 2018 to 2020.

Menteri Besar of Johor (2020–2022)

On 28 February 2020, he was sworn in as the new Menteri Besar by the Sultan Ibrahim Ismail, replacing the incumbent Dato' Dr. Sahruddin Jamal after the collapse of Pakatan Harapan (PH) state government during the 2020 Malaysian political crisis.

In the Johor state election on 12 March 2022, he led his coalition to a huge and landslide victory in the 2022 Johor state election, winning 40 out of 56 state seats, giving him a two-thirds majority to form the next state government with a much stronger mandate after he lost the majority with only 28 seats in the assembly following the death of Kempas assemblyman Osman Sapian and strengthening his grip on power and position as Menteri Besar of Johor. BN Chairman and UMNO President Ahmad Zahid Hamidi also added that he would submit the name of Hasni to the Sultan of Johor for his reappointment to the position. However, on 14 March 2022, Hasni suddenly announced his withdrawal from the running for the position by stating that he would pave way and endorse a younger candidate to lead the state government citing long term development for Johor and the next day on 15 March 2022, caretaker EXCO member and new Machap MLA Onn Hafiz Ghazi was sworn in as the new and 19th Menteri Besar to take over him after his 2 years in office.

Member of Parliament for Simpang Renggam (since 2022) 
In the 2022 general election, Hasni wrested the Simpang Renggam seat in Johor from Maszlee Malik of PH with a majority of 1,821 votes.

Election results

Honours

Honours of Malaysia 
  :
 Member of the Order of the Defender of the Realm (AMN) (2003)
 Officer of the Order of the Defender of the Realm (KMN) (2006)
  :
  Grand Knight of the Order of the Territorial Crown (SUMW) – Datuk Seri Utama (2022)
  :
  Second Class of the Sultan Ibrahim Medal (PIS II) (1999)
  Second Class of the Sultan Ibrahim of Johor Medal (PSI II) (2015)
  Knight Grand Commander of the Order of the Crown of Johor (SPMJ) – Dato' (2021)
  :
 Commander of the Order of Kinabalu (PGDK) – Datuk (2006)

References

External links 
 Hasni Mohammad on Facebook
 Hasni Mohammad on Twitter

Living people
1958 births
People from Johor
Malaysian people of Malay descent
Malaysian people of Javanese descent
Malaysian Muslims
Missouri University of Science and Technology alumni
United Malays National Organisation politicians
Members of the Dewan Rakyat
Members of the Johor State Legislative Assembly
Johor state executive councillors
Chief Ministers of Johor
Leaders of the Opposition in the Johor State Legislative Assembly
Members of the Order of the Defender of the Realm
Officers of the Order of the Defender of the Realm
21st-century Malaysian politicians
Knights Grand Commander of the Order of the Crown of Johor
Commanders of the Order of Kinabalu